Englander is a surname. Notable people by that name include:

 A. A. Englander (1915–2004), British television cinematographer.
 David Englander (1949–1999), British labour historian.
 Israel Englander (born 1948), American investor and hedge fund manager.
 Ludwig Engländer (1853-1914), Austrian-born American composer.
 Mitchell Englander (born 1970), member of the Los Angeles City Council.
 Nathan Englander (born 1970), American short story writer and novelist.
 Peter Englander, director of Apax Partners.